Ritsch, ratsch, filibom is a song and singing game, used when dancing around the Christmas tree and the Midsummer pole. The song was published in the second edition of Sånglekar från Nääs , which was published in 1915.

Recordings
An early recording was done by Konsertorkestern in Stockholm on 27 May 1925.

References

Swedish-language songs
Swedish songs
1915 songs